Somano is a comune (municipality) in the Province of Cuneo in the Italian region Piedmont, located about  southeast of Turin and about  northeast of Cuneo.

The municipality of Somano contains the frazioni (subdivisions, mainly villages and hamlets) Fossati, Altavilla, Sant'Antonio, Manzoni, Albere, Garombo, Curine, Peisino, Ruatalunga, and Costalunga.

Somano borders the following municipalities: Bonvicino, Bossolasco, and Dogliani.

Demographic evolution

References

Cities and towns in Piedmont